Earth (translit. Zemlya) is a 1930 Soviet silent film by Ukrainian director Oleksandr Dovzhenko. The film concerns the process of collectivization and the hostility of kulak landowners under the First Five-Year Plan. It is the third film, with Zvenigora and Arsenal, of Dovzhenko's "Ukraine Trilogy".

The script was inspired by Dovzhenko's life and experience of the process of collectivization in his native Ukraine. That process, which was the backdrop of the film and its production, informed its reception in the Soviet Union, which was largely negative.

Earth is commonly regarded as Dovzhenko's masterpiece and as one of the greatest films ever made. The film was voted number 10 on the prestigious Brussels 12 list at the 1958 World Expo.

Plot
The film begins with a montage of wind blowing through a field of wheat and sunflowers. Next, an old peasant named Semen dies beneath an apple tree, attended by his son Opanas and grandson Vasyl. Elsewhere local kulaks, including Arkhyp Bilokin, denounce collectivization and declare their resistance to it. At Opanas's home, Vasyl and his friends meet to discuss collectivization and argue with Opanas, who is skeptical about collectivization.

Later, Vasyl arrives with the community's first tractor to much excitement. After the men urinate in the overheated radiator, the peasants plow the land with the tractor and harvest the grain, in the process plowing over the kulaks' fences. A montage sequence presents the production of bread from beginning to end. That night Vasyl dances a hopak along a path on his way home and is killed by a dark figure. Opanas looks for Vasyl's killer and confronts Khoma, Bilokin's son, who does not confess.

Vasyl's father turns away the Russian Orthodox priest who expects to lead the funeral, declaring his atheism. He asks Vasyl's friends to give his son a secular funeral and "sing new songs for a new life." The villagers do so, while Vasyl's fiancée, Natalya, mourns him and the local priest curses them. At the cemetery, Khoma arrives in a frenzy to declare that he will resist collectivization and that he killed Vasyl. The villagers ignore him while one of Vasyl's friends eulogizes him. The film ends with a montage showing a downpour of rain over fruit and vegetables, after which Natalya finds herself embraced in Vasyl's arms.

Cast

 as Opanas
 as Vasyl
Yuliya Solntseva as Vasyl's sister
Yelena Maksimova as Natalya
 as Semen
 as Khoma Bilokin
Ivan Franko as Arkhyp Bilokin
Volodymyr Mikhajlov as priest
Pavlo Petrik as Communist Party cell leader
O. Umanets as peasant
Ye. Bondina as peasant girl
 as young kulak

Production
Dovzhenko wrote, produced, and filmed Earth in 1929, during the process of collectivization in the Ukrainian Soviet Socialist Republic, which he described as "a period … of economic [and] mental transformation of the whole people." Collectivization began in 1929 as Soviet General Secretary Joseph Stalin sought to control agriculture in the Soviet Union as it industrialized. This meant the collectivization of privately-owned farms, which peasants resisted by killing their draft animals, sabotaging agricultural machinery, and assassinating Soviet agents. Much of Earths script was inspired by Dovzhenko's experience of this process; Vasyl's death was based on the assassination of a Soviet agent in his home district. Dovzhenko also drew inspiration from his childhood memories, for instance basing the character of Semyon on his own grandfather.

Production of Earth began on 24 May 1929 and was finished on 25 February 1930. The original soundtrack was composed by Levko Revutsky.

Cinematography

Filming mostly took place in the Poltava Oblast of Ukraine. To shoot the film, Dovzhenko partnered with the Ukrainian cinematographer , who also shot two of Dovzhenko's previous films, Zvenigora and Arsenal. Close-ups are used extensively to highlight one or several characters, usually unnamed peasants, frequently motionless. Film scholar Gilberto Perez likened Earths cinematography to Homer's Odyssey, as "all that  counts, in a given moment, is what is … clearly displayed on the screen".

Vasyl's dance celebrating the success of the harvest was originally scripted as a Cossack-style hopak but Svashenko altered it after consulting local Ukrainian farmers.

Release
Earth was released on 8 April 1930 and was banned by Soviet authorities nine days later. Before the film was approved for general distribution, certain scenes criticized as giving the film a "biological" focus, such as the peasants urinating into the tractor's radiator, were removed. The original negative for the film was destroyed in 1941 by a German air raid during the First Battle of Kyiv. In 1952, Dovzhenko adapted the film into a novelization.

In 2012, the National Oleksandr Dovzhenko Film Center, the Ukrainian state film archive, restored Earth and gave it a new score by the Ukrainian folk quartet DakhaBrakha. This version of the film premiered at the 2012 Odesa International Film Festival.

Reception 
Earths reception in the Soviet Union consisted  of high praise – receiving a standing ovation at its debut and the endorsement of the Red Army – and sharp criticism. Soviet authorities and journalists simultaneously lauded the film for its "formal mastery" and derided it for perceived ideological shortcomings. Pravda, the official newspaper of the Communist Party, praised the film's visual style but called its political content "false". The Soviet poet Demyan Bedny attacked Earth, calling it "counterrevolutionary" and "defeatist" in the newspaper Izvestia. 

Film critic C. A. Lejeune praised the film's main section, saying that it "contains perhaps more understanding of pure beauty in cinema, more validity of relation in moving image, than any ten minutes of production yet known to the screen." Lewis Jacobs compared Dovzhenko's work to Eisenstein and Pudovkin, stating that Dovzhenko "had added a deep personal and poetic insight … [his films] are laconic in style, with a strange, wonderfully imaginative quality difficult to describe." Film director Grigori Roshal praised the film, writing, "Neither Eisenstein nor Pudovkin have achieved the tenderness and warmth in speaking about men and the world that Oleksandr Dovzhenko has revealed. Dovzhenko is always experimental. He is always an innovator and always a poet."

Dovzhenko's biographer Marco Carynnyk lauded the film's "passionate simplicity … which has made it a masterpiece of world cinema" and praised its "powerful lyric affirmation of life." It was ranked #88 in the 1995 Centenary Poll of the 100 Best Films of the Century in Time Out magazine. The work also received 10 critics' votes in the 2012 Sight & Sound polls of the world's greatest films. The British Film Institute said of Earth that its plot "is secondary to the extraordinarily potent images of wheatfields, ripe fruit and weatherbeaten faces".

Legacy
Earth is widely considered to be Dovzhenko's magnum opus, and among the greatest films ever made. The National Oleksandr Dovzhenko Film Center considers Earth to be the most famous Ukrainian film made. Earth was voted one of the twelve greatest films of all time by a group of 117 film historians at the 1958 Brussels World's Fair and was selected as one of five films to be screened at a festival to celebrate the 70th anniversary of UNESCO in 2015.

See also
Dovzhenko Film Studios
Holodomor
List of Soviet films of 1930
Soviet propaganda

References

Books

Articles

External links 

 (English subtitles)

Ray Uzwyshyn's Earth (1930): Philosophy, Iconology, Collectivization
Senses of Cinema Poetry in Motion: Alexander Dovzhenko’s Earth

1930 films
1930 drama films
Soviet silent feature films
Soviet propaganda films
Soviet-era Ukrainian films
Ukrainian black-and-white films
Soviet black-and-white films
Films about the Soviet Union in the Stalin era
Films set in Ukraine
Films shot in Ukraine
Dovzhenko Film Studios films
All-Ukrainian Photo Cinema Administration films
Films directed by Alexander Dovzhenko
Russian Futurist film
Soviet drama films
Ukrainian silent feature films
Films critical of religion
Films about agriculture
Silent drama films